Sven Thermænius (1910–1971) was a Swedish cinematographer. He was active in Swedish cinema from the 1930s to the 1950s.

Selected filmography
 Two Men and a Widow (1933)
 The Pale Count (1937)
 Sun Over Sweden (1938)
 We at Solglantan (1939)
 Frestelse (1940)
 Hanna in Society (1940)
 Sunny Sunberg (1941)
 Scanian Guerilla (1941)
 Adventurer (1942)
 The Case of Ingegerd Bremssen (1942)
 Life in the Country (1943)
 We Need Each Other (1944)
 Turn of the Century (1944)
 The Happy Tailor (1945)
 Private Karlsson on Leave (1947)
 Dynamite (1947)
 When Love Came to the Village (1950)
 The Saucepan Journey (1950)
 The Clang of the Pick (1952)
 For the Sake of My Intemperate Youth (1952)
 Bread of Love (1953)
 Enchanted Walk (1954)
 The Vicious Breed (1954)

References

Bibliography
 Warren, Lynne. Encyclopedia of Twentieth-Century Photography. Routledge, 2005.

External links

1910 births
1971 deaths
Swedish cinematographers
People from Stockholm